Derek Francis (7 November 1923 – 27 March 1984) was an English comedy and character actor.

Biography
Francis was a regular in the Carry On film players, appearing in six of the films in the 1960s and 1970s. He appeared in The Tomb of Ligeia (1964), the last film in Roger Corman's Edgar Allan Poe series. He also took roles in several BBC adaptations of Charles Dickens novels. His last role was in the 1984 version of A Christmas Carol.

Other roles included parts in television series of the period such as Rising Damp, Bless Me, Father, Thriller, The Professionals, The Sweeney, Sherlock Holmes, The New Avengers, Danger Man, Jason King, Up Pompeii!, Wild, Wild Women, Coronation Street, and Z-Cars. He also appeared as the Emperor Nero, a comic turn in the early Doctor Who story entitled The Romans opposite William Hartnell. Possibly his most prominent role was as Father Bernard, the Master of Novices in Oh Brother!.

Among his stage roles was the title character in Cymbeline for the Old Vic in 1957.

Francis died of a heart attack in Wimbledon, London, at the age of 60.

Selected filmography

 The Criminal (1960) as The Priest
 No Love for Johnnie (1961) as Frank
 Two Living, One Dead (1961) as Broms
 Never Back Losers (1961) as R.R. Harris
 The Inspector (1962) – Detective Inspector
 Captain Clegg (1962) as Squire Anthony Cobtree
 Master Spy (1963) as Police Inspector (uncredited)
 Bitter Harvest (1963) as Mr. Jones
 The Hi-Jackers (1963) as Jack Carter
 Farewell Performance (1963) as Superintendent Raven
 Smokescreen (1964) as Dexter's Doctor (uncredited)
 This Is My Street (1964) as Fingus
 The Verdict (1964) as Superintendent Brett
 Ring of Spies (1964) as Chief Supt. Croft
 Master Spy (1964) as Police Inspector (uncredited)
 The Comedy Man (1964) as Merryweather
 The Tomb of Ligeia (1964) as Lord Trevanion
 Doctor Who (1965) as Emperor Nero
 The Little Ones (1965) as Paddy
 Rasputin, the Mad Monk (1966) as Innkeeper
 Press for Time (1966) as Ernest Corcoran (alderman)
 The Forsyte Saga (1967) as Elderson
 Jules Verne's Rocket to the Moon (1967) as Puddleby
 Carry On Doctor (1967) as Sir Edmund Burke
 What's Good for the Goose (1969) as Harrington
 Carry On Camping (1969) as a Farmer
 Crossplot (1969) as Sir Charles Moberley
 Carry On Loving (1970) as The Bishop
 Scrooge (1970) as Charity Gentleman
 Man of Violence (1971) as Sam Bryant
 Say Hello to Yesterday (1971) as Park Keeper
 The Statue (1971) as Sanders
 Carry On Henry (1971) as The Farmer
 Carry On Matron (1972) as Arthur
 Carry On Abroad (1972) as Brother Martin
 To the Devil a Daughter (1976) as Bishop
 Dickens of London (1976) as Stage Manager
 Jabberwocky (1977) as Bishop
 The Wicked Lady (1983) as Lord Kingsclere
 Pope John Paul II (1984) as Bishop Lec
 A Christmas Carol (1984) as Pemberton (final film role)

References

External links

1923 births
1984 deaths
English male film actors
English male television actors
People from Brighton
20th-century English male actors